Volucella pellucens, the pellucid fly, is a hoverfly.

Distribution and habitat
This species occurs in much of Europe, and across the Palearctic to Japan. The adult V. pellucens is usually found in woodlands and wooded hedgerows, but will enter gardens.

Description
Volucella pellucens is about 13–17 mm in length, with a wing length about 10–15.5 mm.

These hoverflies have a broad, mainly black body, but the front part of their abdomens have a broad, yellow band, giving them the appearance of a bee or wasp. Their two wings are transparent, as with most flies, but the leading edge is amber, with a brown patch on each wing.

The mimicry of bees or wasps in shape and colouration is shown by other hoverflies, which is thought to protect against falling prey to birds and other insectivores that avoid eating true wasps because of their stings. However, the difference between hoverflies and wasps or bees is hoverflies have two wings, and the Hymenoptera species have four.

Biology

Adults live on nectar and pollen, as with most hoverflies, and visits a large range of flowers from May to October, showing a distinct preference for white flowers, such as Sambucus, Cornus, Ligustrum, Rubus idaeus, and bramble and Apiaceae, but they also feed on Asteraceae, Valeriana officinalis, Succisa pratensis, Chamerion angustifolium, and Urtica dioica. It typically flies at head height.

The female enters the underground paper nests of the common wasp, Vespula vulgaris, or the German wasp, V. germanica, and lays her eggs. Despite the conspicuous nature of the intruder, the hosts do not appear to register her presence as she makes her way into the otherwise well-guarded nest entrance. The V. pellucens larvae then feed on the hosts' young and dead adults.

When the eggs hatch, the larvae drop to the bottom of the nest chamber, where they feed as scavengers on debris. This may include dead wasp grubs and adults, remains of food brought into the nest by the wasps, and other insects living there. Mature larvae are sometimes on the combs and have been recorded feeding on dead or moribund wasp larvae and pupae that were left in the combs when the nest was abandoned by the wasps in the autumn. Fully grown larvae leave the nest and pupate in the soil below. If the host nest is in the roof or walls of a house, then the larvae may end up crawling about in the dwelling space.

Adult hoverflies emerge the following year from about mid-May to June.

See also
 List of hoverfly species recorded in Britain

References

Further reading

Michael Chinery, Insectes de France et d'Europe occidentale, Paris, Flammarion, août 2012, 320 p., p. 206-207

Volucella
Diptera of Asia
Diptera of Europe
Insects described in 1758
Taxa named by Carl Linnaeus